Anthony Torrone (born March 10, 1955) is an American Christian author who has a developmental disability. Torrone's 2011 book, Anthony's Prayers, was inspired by his time and the abuse that he experienced as a resident of the former Willowbrook State School, a New York State mental hospital for children. Torrone has been a resident of Grand Rapids, Michigan since the 1970s.

References

1955 births
20th-century American writers
21st-century American non-fiction writers
Living people
American Christian writers
Writers from Grand Rapids, Michigan
People from Staten Island
People with intellectual disability